The 1896 Wellington City mayoral election was part of the New Zealand local elections held that same year. The polling was conducted using the standard first-past-the-post electoral method.

Background
In 1896 incumbent Mayor George Fisher was defeated by former Mayor Francis Bell. Bell had served as Mayor from 1891 to 1893.

Mayoralty results
The following table gives the election results:

Notes

References

Mayoral elections in Wellington
1896 elections in New Zealand
Politics of the Wellington Region
1890s in Wellington